Aleksandr Vladislavovich Vladimirov (born 24 January 1977) is a Russian former professional footballer.

Club career
He made his debut in the Russian Premier League in 1995 for FC Rostselmash Rostov-on-Don.

References

1977 births
Footballers from Saint Petersburg
Living people
Russian footballers
Russia youth international footballers
Russia under-21 international footballers
Association football goalkeepers
FC Rostov players
FC Baltika Kaliningrad players
FC Sibir Novosibirsk players
Russian Premier League players
FC Gornyak Uchaly players
FC Oryol players
FC Dynamo Saint Petersburg players
FC Novokuznetsk players
FC Lokomotiv Saint Petersburg players
PFC CSKA Moscow players